Princess Bhrikuti Devi (known to Tibetans as , Bhelsa Tritsun (Nepal ), or simply, ) of Licchavi is traditionally considered to have been the first wife and queen of the earliest emperor of Tibet, Songtsen Gampo (605?–650 CE), and an incarnation of Tara. She was also known as "Besa", and was a princess of the Licchavi kingdom of Nepal and later the queen consort of Tibet.

Life
Even though the historicity of Bhrikuti Devi is not certain, and no reference to her has been found among the documents discovered at Dunhuang, "there are increasing indications supporting this hypothesis." There were certainly very close relationships between Tibet and Nepal at this period and, "Such a mythological interpretation discredits in no way the historical likelihood of such a marriage...."

Many Tibetan accounts make Bhrikuti the daughter of Amshuvarma (605–621 CE), co-ruler and successor of Śivadeva I. If this is correct, the marriage to Songtsen Gampo must have taken place sometime before 624 CE. Acharya Kirti Tulku Lobsang Tenzin, however, states that Songstän Gampo married Bhrkuti Devi, the daughter of king "Angsu Varma" or Amshuvarma (Tib: Waser Gocha) of Nepal in 632.

According to some Tibetan legends, however, a Nepali king named Go Cha (identified by Sylvain Lévi as "Udayavarman", from the literal meaning of the Tibetan name) was said to have a daughter called Bri-btumn or Bhṛkuti.

"Udayavarman" was most likely the same king we know as Udayadeva, the son of Śivadeva I and later, the adopted son and heir to Aṃshuvarmā. He was also thought to be the father of Narendradeva (Tib: Miwang-Lha). If this is accepted, it means that Narendradeva and Bhrikuti Devi were brother and sister.

We do have some fairly detailed historical accounts of Narendradeva. The (Jiu) Tangshu, or Old Book of Tang, records that when the king of Nepal, the father of Licchavi king Naling Deva (or Narendradeva), died, an uncle (Yu.sna kug.ti = Vishnagupta) usurped the throne. "The Tibetans gave him [Narendradeva] refuge and reestablished him on his throne [in 641]; that is how he became subject to Tibet."

It is not known exactly when Bhrikuti married Songtsen Gampo, but it was presumably about the time that Narendradeva fled to Tibet (c. 621 CE), following Dhruvadeva's take-over of the throne  (who, according to an inscription dated in 623, was ruling jointly with Jiṣṇugupta.)

Bhrikuti in Tibet

This is considered to be the oldest copy of the famous traditional history, the dBa' bzhed, states:

Furthermore, the construction of the forty-two temples of the Ru bzhi was requested and the Brag lha [temple] was built. 'Thon mi gSam po ra was sent by royal order [to India] in order to get the Indian doctrine and the model of the alphabet (yi ge'i dpe). . . ."

According to Tibetan traditions, Bhrikuti was a devout Buddhist and brought many sacred images and expert Newari craftsmen with her as part of her dowry. The Red Palace (Mar-po-ri Pho-drang) on Marpo Ri (Red Mountain) in Lhasa, which was later rebuilt into the thirteen storey Potala by the Fifth Dalai Lama, was constructed by Nepali craftsmen according to her wishes. She also had constructed the Tub-wang and other statues in Samye and the famous Nepali artist Thro-wo carved the revered statue of Chenresig, Thungji Chen-po rang-jung nga-ldan. It is also called statue of Mikyo Dorje (Manuvajra) – the Ramoche Jowo or Jowo Chungpa which was housed in the Ramoche Temple in Lhasa. It seems unlikely that the statue there now is the original one brought by the Nepali princess as the temple has been sacked at least two times – first during the Mongol invasions and later it was gutted in the 1960s. It is said that the lower half of the statue was found in a Lhasa rubbish dump and the upper part found in Beijing. They have been since joined and the statue is surrounded by the Eight Bodhisattvas.

Songtsen Gampo and Bhrikuti built a great temple, the Tsulag Khang (or 'House of Wisdom') to house the images, which is now known as the Jokhang ('House of the Lord') in the heart of Lhasa, and is considered to be the most sacred temple in Tibet. They also built the white palace of dMar-po-ri which shifted the ancient seat of government in the Yarlung Valley to the site of modern Lhasa.

Bhrikuti is usually represented as Green Tara in Tibetan iconography. Songtsen Gampo also married the Chinese Princess Wencheng, who is considered to be another incarnation of Tara (White Tara), in 641 CE, and Bhrikuti and Wencheng are said to have worked together to establish temples and Buddhism in Tibet.

Footnotes

References and further reading
Richardson, Hugh E. (1997). "Mun Sheng Kong Co and Kim Sheng Kong Co: Two Chinese Princesses in Tibet." The Tibet Journal. Vol. XXII, No. 1. Spring 1997, pp. 3–11.
Richardson, Hugh E. (1965). "How Old was Srong Brtsan Sgampo" Bulletin of Tibetology 2.1. pp 5–8.

7th-century births
7th-century deaths
History of Tibet
History of Nepal
Nepalese princesses
Tibetan empresses
Tibetan Buddhists
Vajrayana and women
7th-century Nepalese people